"Abraham, Martin and John" is a 1968 song written by Dick Holler. It was first recorded by Dion, in a version that was a substantial North American chart hit in 1968–1969.  Near-simultaneous cover versions by Smokey Robinson and the Miracles and Moms Mabley also charted in the U.S. in 1969, and a version that same year by Marvin Gaye became the hit version in the UK.  It was also a hit as part of a medley (with "What the World Needs Now Is Love") for Tom Clay in 1971, and has subsequently been recorded by many other artists.

The song itself is a tribute to the memory of four assassinated Americans, all icons of social change: Abraham Lincoln, Martin Luther King Jr., John F. Kennedy, and Robert F. Kennedy. It was written in response to the assassination of King and that of Robert Kennedy in April and June 1968, respectively.

Lyrics
Each of the first three verses features one of the men named in the song's title, for example:

After a bridge, the fourth and final verse mentions "Bobby" (referencing Robert F. Kennedy), and ends with a description of him walking over a hill with the other three men.

Dion recording

The original version, recorded by Dion, featured a gentle folk rock production from Phil Gernhard and arrangement from John Abbott. The song features a flugelhorn, an electric organ, bass, and drums.

Although it was quite unlike the rock sound that Dion had become famous for in the early 1960s, and even more unlike Holler and Gernhard's previous collaboration in the 1966 novelty smash "Snoopy Vs. The Red Baron", "Abraham, Martin and John" nonetheless was a major American hit single in late 1968. It reached number 4 on the Hot 100 and number 1 on Chicago station WLS and was awarded an RIAA gold record for selling a million copies. In Canada, it topped the charts, reaching number 1 in the RPM 100 on November 25, 1968. In 2001, this recording would be ranked number 248 on the RIAA's Songs of the Century list. The record was also popular with adult listeners, reaching number 8 on the Billboard Easy Listening survey. The personnel on the original recording included Vinnie Bell and Ralph Casale on guitar, Nick DeCaro on organ, David Robinson on drums, Gloria Agostini on harp, and George Marge on oboe and English horn.

Chart performance

Weekly charts

Year-end charts

Later recordings and performances
 Smokey Robinson & the Miracles recorded a version that became an American Top 40 single in 1969, reaching number 33 while reaching number 16 on the US R&B charts
 Marvin Gaye, with an orchestral arrangement by Norman Whitfield, also recorded a version in 1969 that became a top-ten hit (reaching number 9) in the United Kingdom in 1970 (Gaye's version was never released in the U.S. as a single but was featured on his 1970 album, That's the Way Love Is, and was one of his first experiments with social messages in his music which would culminate in his 1971 album, What's Going On.)
 Moms Mabley, best known as a comedian, performed a completely serious version that hit the U.S. Top 40. It reached number 35 in July 1969 and number 18 on the R&B charts, making Mabley (at 75) the oldest living person to have a U.S. Top 40 hit. 
 Ray Charles recorded his version of the song on his 1972 album A Message from the People.
 Marillion released two versions in 1999. A live recording was on their Unplugged at the Walls album, and a studio version on their fan club Christmas CD the same year.
 Whitney Houston performed the song in her live concert in 1997 which aired on VH1 and HBO as Whitney Houston: Live Washington DC..
 Wilson Pickett recorded a variation of the song, "Cole, Cooke & Redding" (US number 91 / Canada number 58), as the B-side of his 1970 version of The Archies' hit "Sugar, Sugar". His version altered the lyrics to eulogize the titular three deceased icons of black music.
 Harry Belafonte recorded the song in his 1970 album Belafonte By Request released by RCA Records
 Bob Dylan and Clydie King in the Dylan concert movie "Trouble No More" released by Sony in 2017
 Leonard Nimoy included this song in his 1970 LP, "The New World Of Leonard Nimoy" (Dot Records, DLP 25966)
 Beverly Knight performed the song with the Royal Philharmonic Orchestra and Gaye's 1969 recording on the 2021 album Motown with the Royal Philharmonic Orchestra: A Symphony of Soul (Motown/Island Records/UMC)
 Rosey Grier, who had been one of Robert F. Kennedy's bodyguards and helped subdue Sirhan Sirhan after the shots that killed Senator Kennedy following his victory in the 1968 California Democratic primary were fired, recorded a version for his 1986 gospel album Committed.

As part of medleys
The song is also featured on Tom Clay's 1971 "What the World Needs Now Is Love/Abraham, Martin, and John", a medley combining Dion's recording with Jackie DeShannon's recording of Burt Bacharach's "What the World Needs Now Is Love", along with vocals by The Blackberries. Clay's recording features narration (an adult asking a child to define several words associated with social unrest), sound bites from speeches given by President John F. Kennedy, Robert F. Kennedy, and Martin Luther King Jr., along with sound bites from the live press coverage of Robert Kennedy's assassination, and his eulogy by his brother Edward M. Kennedy.  It reached number 8 on the Billboard Hot 100 chart on August 14, 1971 and number 32 on the R&B charts. It reached number 3 in Australia.

Emmylou Harris performed it as the second part of a medley with Nanci Griffith's song "It's a Hard Life Wherever You Go" with her acoustic band, the Nash Ramblers, in the early 1990s. The medley was released on their 1992 live album At the Ryman.

See also
Civil rights movement in popular culture
Cultural depictions of Abraham Lincoln
Cultural depictions of John F. Kennedy

References

Further reading
Collins, Ace. Songs Sung, Red, White, and Blue: The Stories Behind America's Best-Loved Patriotic Songs.  HarperResource, 2003.

External links
 Abraham Martin and John - by song's writer, Richard Holler
 Dion - Abraham Martin and John

1968 singles
1969 singles
1971 singles
Songs about the assassination of John F. Kennedy
Works about the Robert F. Kennedy assassination
Songs written by Dick Holler
Dion DiMucci songs
Marvin Gaye songs
The Miracles songs
Andy Williams songs
Motown singles
Laurie Records singles
Commemoration songs
Songs about Martin Luther King Jr.
1968 songs
American patriotic songs
American folk rock songs
RPM Top Singles number-one singles
Songs about Abraham Lincoln